The Bibliotheca Hagiographica Latina is a catalogue of Latin hagiographic materials, including ancient literary works on the saints' lives, the translations of their relics, and their miracles, arranged alphabetically by saint.  The listings include manuscripts, incipits, and printed editions.  The first edition (1898-1901) and supplement (1911) were edited by the Bollandists, which included the Jesuit scholar Hippolyte Delehaye.  The most recent supplement is the product of a single editor, the Polish Jesuit , also Bollandist.

The Bibliotheca Hagiographica Graeca and Bibliotheca Hagiographica Orientalis catalogue hagiography, respectively, written in Greek and Middle Eastern languages.

Editions
  (AJ)
  (KZ)
 
  (Includes the contents of the 1911 supplement.)

See also 
Bibliotheca Hagiographica Graeca
Bibliotheca Hagiographica Orientalis

References

External links
 Online database search of Bibliotheca Hagiographica Latina 
 Société des Bollandistes
 Clavis Clavium, a database containing all BHL records

Christian hagiography
Jesuit publications
Catalogues
20th-century Latin books
Belgian books
20th-century non-fiction books
20th-century history books